"Nothin' Shakin' (But the Leaves on the Trees)" is a song written by Eddie Fontaine, Cirino Colacrai, Diane Lampert and John Gluck, Jr. Fontaine first recorded it in 1958 for Sunbeam Records, which released it as a single with the Arnie Goland Orchestra included in the artist's credit. The record reached number 64 on the Billboard Hot 100.

In 1972, a version by Billy "Crash" Craddock reached number 10 on the Billboard Hot Country Singles and the top position on the Canadian RPM Country Tracks charts.

References

1958 singles
1972 singles
The Beatles songs
Billy "Crash" Craddock songs
1958 songs